Larbaâ ( al-Larbaʾāʾ) is a town in commune in Blida Province, Algeria. According to the 1998 census it has a population of 60,482.

References

Communes of Blida Province